Aksyon Demokratiko or simply Aksyon is a political party in the Philippines founded by Raul Roco. It was recognized as a national political party in 1998 by the Commission on Elections (COMELEC) and is considered to be one of the major parties in the Philippines. Former Manila Mayor Isko Moreno currently acts as president of the party.

History 
Aksyon participated in national and local elections since its founding (1998, 2001, 2004, 2007, 2010, 2013, 2016 and 2019) where it had moderate successes.

2010 Liberal Party coalition, and the 2016 and 2019 elections 
In 2010, the party signed a coalition agreement with the Liberal Party in order to jointly field then Senator Benigno Aquino III for president.

For the 2016 Philippine general election, the party fielded national and local candidates throughout the Philippines including lawyer Lorna Kapunan and TIEZA COO Mark Lapid. It was aligned with the candidacy of Grace Poe.

The party's standard bearer for the 2019 senatorial elections was former Solicitor General Florin Hilbay. Prominent local government candidates of the party during the 2019 elections included Vico Sotto and Roman Romulo, who ran as mayor and representative of Pasig respectively, and Marielle del Rosario ran as representative of Navotas.

2022 Elections and Isko Moreno presidential run 
In 2021, Aksyon named then Manila Mayor Isko Moreno Domagoso, who just joined the party from the National Unity Party, as its new party president ahead of the 2022 Philippine presidential election. New notable party members that would follow included 2019 senatorial candidate Samira Gutoc, Caloocan 2nd district representative Edgar Erice and former Vice President Noli de Castro. 

A number of party members expressed disappointment with Aksyon's choices during the 2022 election campaign. In October 2021, former Aksyon Demokratiko senatorial candidate Florin Hilbay resigned from Aksyon Demokratiko "out of ethical considerations," because he chose to support the candidacy of Vice President Leni Robredo instead of that of Domagoso, adding that "We can’t afford another narcissistic, gas lighting troll for a president" but without specifically mentioning Domagoso by name. On April 2, 2022, former Aksyon executive director Erdie de los Santos also resigned to support Robredo, rather than Domagoso. Olongapo City Councilor Kaye Ann Legaspi, Aksyon's former vice president for youth affairs, led a faction of about a hundred party members expressing disappointment over Domagoso's tactics and saying that he was "damaging" the values that the party's founder Raul Roco had represented.

In June 2022, immediately after the 2022 elections, Executive Vice-President Vico Sotto resigned from the party, saying he believed "recent events have made it apparent that the party is now headed towards a different direction." However, Sotto did not announce the fact of his resignation until five months later, in November 2022.

Ideology 
Magbago! (Change!) Makialam! (Participate!) Sulong sa Bagong Pilipinas! (Forward to a New Philippines!) are the party's slogans. Aksyon is rooted in Raul Roco's The Agenda of Hope: honest government; opportunity for all, special privileges for none; peace, productivity and prosperity; education and environment for sustainable development.

Aksyon believes that there should be regional solutions to regional problems. Aksyon organizes itself based on the principles of local autonomy. It believes and pushes for the empowerment of the Filipino masses. The party advocates a 'bottom-up' approach in tackling the issues of the country. Aksyon recognizes the importance of the participation of youth in government and therefore actively pushes for the empowerment of the youth.

Electoral performance

Presidential and vice presidential elections

Legislative elections

Current party officials 
 Sonia Roco, Party Co-founder, Chair Emeritus
 Ernest Ramel (former Aksyon Demokratiko's Secretary General), Party Chairman and National Executive Board Member
 Francisco Moreno Domagoso (former Manila City Mayor), Party President and National Executive Board Member
 Andres Lacson (Former Concepcion, Tarlac Mayor), Vice Chairperson and National Executive Board Member
 Leon Flores III (former National Youth Commission Chairperson), Secretary-General and National Executive Board Member
 Honey Lacuna Pangan (current Manila City Mayor), Vice-President for Internal Affairs and National Executive Board Member
 Atty. Bobbit Roco, Vice-President for External Affairs and National Executive Board Member
 May Lim, Vice-President for Women Affairs
 Jayson San Juan, Deputy Secretary-General
 Michael Roy Cuerpo, Treasurer and National Executive Board Member
 Atty. Normandy Baldovino, Jr, General Counsel and National Executive Board Member
 Samira Gutoc, National Executive Board Member
Antonio Aquino, National Executive Board Member
Frein Jarane P. Castañeda (former Mariveles, Bataan Councilor), National Executive Board Member
Danilo De Guzman (current Mandaluyong City Councilor), National Executive Board Member
Ernesto C. Isip Jr. (current Manila City Councilor), National Executive Board Member
Richard C. Ibay (former Manila City Councilor), National Executive Board Member
Anthony P. Sanchez, National Executive Board Member
Jose Cabochan, National Executive Board Member
Sainthia Joy A. Sorilla (current New Lucena, Iloilo Councilor), National Executive Board Member
Atty. Joel R. Chua (current Representative from Manila), National Executive Board Member
Atty. Marlon M. Lacson (former Manila City Councilor), National Executive Board Member
Manuel M. Zarcal (former Manila City Councilor), National Executive Board Member

References

1997 establishments in the Philippines
Centrist parties in the Philippines
Political parties established in 1997
Progressive parties